The 1999 Orange Prokom Open singles was the singles event of the second edition of the most prestigious women's tennis tournament held in Poland. Henrieta Nagyová was the defending champion, and the sixth seed this year, but she retired 2–6, 1–4 down against Silvija Talaja.

Conchita Martínez won in the final, 6–1, 6–1, against Karina Habšudová, to win her 31st WTA title.

Seeds

Draw

Finals

Top half

Bottom half

Qualifying

Seeds

Qualifiers

Qualifying draw

First qualifier

Second qualifier

Third qualifier

Fourth qualifier

References
 ITF singles results page

Singles
Prokom Polish Open